Nikolai Malikoff (Russian: Николай Петрович Маликов; 1874 – 20 April 1931) was a Russian-Ukrainian film director and actor who worked mainly as a film director in Russia, and later as an actor in Germany.

Selected filmography
 Insulted and Humiliated (1922)
 The Island of Dreams (1925)
 Superfluous People (1926)
 The Son of Hannibal (1926)
 His Toughest Case (1926)
 Fedora (1926)
 The Ones Down There (1926)
 Fräulein Mama (1926)
 Heads Up, Charley (1927)
 The Girl from Abroad (1927)
 The Trial of Donald Westhof (1927)
 Apaches of Paris (1927)
 Rasputin, the Holy Sinner (1928)
 Spy of Madame Pompadour (1928)
 The President (1928)
 The Woman in the Advocate's Gown (1929)
 Storm of Love (1929)
 Rustle of Spring (1929)
 The Ring of the Empress (1930)
 Police Spy 77 (1930)

References

Bibliography 
 Goble, Alan. The Complete Index to Literary Sources in Film. Walter de Gruyter, 1999.

External links 
 

1874 births
1931 deaths
Male actors from the Russian Empire
Film directors from the Russian Empire
Film people from Kyiv

Soviet expatriates in Germany